Bowstock may refer to:

 St Barnabas Community Fete (Bowstock), annual festival in Bow, London
 Bostock, village and civil parish in Cheshire, England